The Nishanwalia/Nishananvali Misl was a Sikh misl. 

The leaders of this Misl used to carry the blue nishans (the flags) of the Sikh army during the battles; hence their name become Nishanwalia. Dasaundha Singh, son of Chowdhry Sahib Rai Shergill, of village Mansurwala (near Kot Issa Khan) was the first chief of this Misl.

The Nishanwalia Misl had strength of twelve thousand soldiers; by 1765, it had captured Ambala, Shahbad-Markanda, Sarai Lashkari Khan, Doraha, Amloh, Zira, Singhanwala and some area around Sahnewal too; Dasaundha Singh died in a battle against Zabita Khan in 1767; he was succeeded by his brother Sangat Singh; Sangat Singh shifted his headquarters from Ambala to Zira where he died in 1774. 

Daljit Singh Shergill forefathers also belonged to this misl.

References

Further reading

Misls